Sivad Heshimu Johnson was a 26 year veteran of the Detroit Fire Department when he perished while trying to save three children from drowning, on August 21, 2020.

Johnson was off-duty, visiting Belle Island, a recreational attraction, with his daughter, when he heard the cries of three sisters.  Johnson and other on-lookers dived in.  The girls were saved, but Johnson was lost.  His body was found the next day.  Click on Detroit reported it was believed he may have been swept away by a rip current.

In 2017 the Detroit Fire Department awarded Sergeant Johnson its Medal of Honor.  Johnson's father and brother also served as firefighters.

On April 16, 2019, Johnson provided a first person account of being trapped, while trying to rescue a civilian from a house fire.

Johnson was also an artist and motivational speaker.  Johnson's name Sivad is Davis, backwards, a way to honor his mother, whose maiden name was Davis.

Detroit was introducing a new fireboat, and, on August 31, 2020, it was announced that the new vessel would be named Sivad Johnson.

References

1970 births
2020 deaths
American firefighters
Deaths by drowning in the United States